Cell Mates is a play by Simon Gray. It opened at the Albery Theatre, London on 16 February 1995, starring Stephen Fry and Rik Mayall, with Gray himself directing. Despite having performed successfully for several weeks during the pre-London warm-up dates in Guildford and Watford then at the Richmond Theatre, Fry left the West End production after three days. His understudy, Mark Anderson, stepped in, until Fry was replaced by Simon Ward. Nevertheless, the production closed on 25 March 1995.

Later in 1995, Gray released an autobiographical account of the production, called Fat Chance. It was published by Faber and Faber.

The play was revived at the Hampstead Theatre in December 2017, in a new production directed by Edward Hall and starring Geoffrey Streatfeild as George Blake.

Plot 
The play concerns George Blake, who has been convicted for spying for the Russians and sentenced to forty-two years' imprisonment, and a fellow prisoner, Sean Bourke. Bourke helps Blake escape to Moscow, after which Blake does not want to let Bourke leave Moscow to return to his native Ireland.

Controversy 
In 1995, Stephen Fry famously walked out of the play near the start of its West End run, after his performance received a bad review in the Financial Times. It was reported at the time that he suffered an attack of stage fright, but he has since disclosed that it was bipolar disorder. Fry walked out of the production for good, leaving only an apology, and provoking its early closure.

Simon Gray described Fry's action as "cowardly", and in a statement to the press said: "It is disgraceful that so much media attention has been devoted to this squalid little story ... I confess my own failure as a director was to have cast Stephen Fry in the first place, and in the second place, not to have acknowledged my error by requesting his departure after his (self-proclaimed) inadequacies were abundantly clear to me." In response to the suggestion his reaction was insensitive to Fry's predicament, Gray added: "I'm a friend of Stephen's. I have great sympathy because he was hurt and stressed, but what he left behind him was the most awful chaos and distress for other people who loved him, including me."

Fry went missing, travelling to Belgium, and contemplating suicide. His personal website says, "The experience still haunts him, but the depression has now faded to embarrassment and the anger to forgiveness."

The incident would be humorously referenced shortly after in Bottom Live: The Big Number Two Tour, in which Rik Mayall also starred.

References 

British plays
1995 plays
West End plays